Salix turnorii, also known as Turnor's willow, is a species of willow. It is endemic to the Athabasca Sand Dunes Provincial Park in Saskatchewan, Canada. It is listed as imperiled by NatureServe.

References 

Endemic flora of Canada
turnorii
Lake Athabasca